Dan Mintz may refer to:

Dan Mintz (producer, director and executive): An American film producer, director and executive born in 1965
Dan Mintz: An American comedian, voice actor and writer born in 1981